Jacy Sheldon is an American college basketball player for the Ohio State Buckeyes of the Big Ten Conference.

High school career
Sheldon played basketball for Dublin Coffman High School in Dublin, Ohio. Before her junior year, she suffered a concussion in a car accident and was unable to play basketball for several weeks. As a junior, she averaged 26.1 points, 6.3 rebounds, 6 assists and 5.2 steals per game, sharing Ohio Prep Sportswriters Association Division I Co-Player of the Year with Kierstan Bell. Sheldon scored a school-record 52 points against Eastmoor Academy, in her senior season. She averaged 28.3 points, 7.1 rebounds, 6.5 assists and 5.1 steals per game as a senior, earning state Division I Player of the Year honors from the Ohio High School Basketball Coaches Association. Sheldon left Coffman as the school's all-time leader in points, assists and steals. She was a three-time Columbus Dispatch All-Metro Player of the Year and Ohio Miss Basketball finalist in high school. In addition to basketball, she was an all-state volleyball player at Coffman.

Rated a five-star recruit by ESPN, Sheldon committed to playing college basketball for Ohio State after also considering Michigan State, Michigan and Indiana, among other programs. She was drawn to the school because she was a lifelong Ohio State fan and wanted to remain close to her younger sister, who has Down syndrome.

College career
On December 17, 2019, Sheldon scored a freshman season-high 23 points in a 104–74 win over Sacramento State. As a freshman, she averaged 9.6 points per game. Sheldon scored a sophomore season-high 29 points in a 92–87 win against Iowa on February 4, 2021. She averaged 16.7 points, 3.7 rebounds and 2.6 assists per game as a sophomore, earning second-team All-Big Ten honors. On January 12, 2022, Sheldon recorded a career-high 33 points, six rebounds and six assists in an 89–83 win against Michigan State. As a junior, she averaged 19.7 points, 4.2 assists and 3.7 rebounds per game. She was named first-team All-Big Ten and made the coaches' All-Defensive Team.

Personal life
Sheldon's father, Duane, played college basketball for Baldwin Wallace before embarking on a coaching career and later becoming the athletic director at Dublin Coffman High School. Her mother, Laura, competed on the track and field team at Baldwin Wallace. Sheldon has a younger brother, Ajay, who plays basketball for Ohio, and a younger sister, Emmy.

References

External links
Ohio State Buckeyes bio

Living people
American women's basketball players
Basketball players from Ohio
People from Dublin, Ohio
Point guards
Ohio State Buckeyes women's basketball players
Year of birth missing (living people)